The Tower of Turghju or Tower of Capu Rossu is a ruined Genoese tower  located in the commune of Piana (Corse-du-Sud) on the west coast of the French island of Corsica.

The tower was built in 1608 under the direction of Anton Giovanni Sarrola with the assistance of Marco Clemente and Taddeo Cantone. It was one of a series of coastal defences constructed by the Republic of Genoa between 1530 and 1620 to stem the attacks by Barbary pirates.

See also
List of Genoese towers in Corsica

References

External links
 Includes information on how to reach 90 towers and many photographs.

Towers in Corsica